Jack Wall (born 1964) is an American video game music composer. He has worked on video game music for over 20 games including the Myst franchise, Splinter Cell, Jade Empire, Mass Effect, and Call of Duty. Wall earned a degree in civil engineering from Drexel University in Philadelphia, Pennsylvania, and, after a brief stint working in civil engineering, transitioned into music production. He worked with musicians such as John Cale, David Byrne, and Patti Smith, and, after performing increasingly complex production and sound engineering tasks, moved into music composition in 1995.

Wall immediately began working in the video game industry, composing the soundtrack to Vigilance. Primarily composing in an orchestral style, by 2001 he composed the soundtrack to Myst III: Exile, which was the title he says put him on the map as a video game composer. In 2002, Wall became one of around 20 co-founders of the Game Audio Network Guild (G.A.N.G.) as well as senior director. In 2005, Wall, along with G.A.N.G. founder and fellow composer Tommy Tallarico, produced the Video Games Live concert series, having served as the conductor for the international concert tour. His latest released soundtrack is that of 2020's Black Ops Cold War. His soundtracks for Myst III: Exile, Myst IV: Revelation, Rise of the Kasai, Jade Empire, Mass Effect, and Mass Effect 2 were nominated for and won multiple awards.

Early life 
Jack Wall, born in Phoenixville, Pennsylvania, earned a degree in civil engineering from Drexel University in Philadelphia and began a career "planning out sub-divisions and shopping malls". At the same time he was in a rock band, as he was also interested in music. After recording a demo tape with the band, he was inspired to change career paths and quit his job to work in the music industry. He initially worked as a bartender and later started working in recording studios in Philadelphia and later Boston and New York City, where he worked for Skyline Studios. In 1991 Wall left Skyline, and until 1994 worked as an independent music producer and sound engineer in New York City, working with musicians such as John Cale, David Byrne, and Patti Smith, as well as local bands. Over those three years, Wall consistently worked with Cale, eventually handling arrangement and orchestration of Cale's compositions as well as producing and working as a sound engineer. While working with Cale on the soundtrack to a movie, House of America, he watched as Cale composed thirty minutes of music in almost real time, and was inspired to begin composing music.

Career 

By late 1995, Wall was living in Los Angeles and was married to singer Cindy Shapiro, who he had met in 1994. She knew Ron Martinez, who was starting a video game company, PostLinear Entertainment, and he asked Wall to work for it as a composer. He composed the soundtracks for several games for PostLinear; the first released was Vigilance in 1997. His daughter Gracie was also born early in 1997. After leaving the company, he composed the soundtrack to 2001's Myst III: Exile, which was his first orchestral score and the work that he said put him on the map as a video game composer. It was also interesting to him, as it was a sequel to the first video game he had ever played, Myst. Myst III was nominated for the Academy of Interactive Arts & Sciences "Outstanding Achievement in Original Music Composition" award, which it lost to the Tropico soundtrack.

In 2002, Wall became one of around 20 co-founders of the Game Audio Network Guild (G.A.N.G.) as well as senior director. The group works to promote the appreciation of video game music, as well as serve as a professional resource for video game music composers and musicians. It was developed and headed by Tommy Tallarico. As of 2010, Wall serves as vice chairman, after stepping down from heading the board of directors in 2007. He continued to compose soundtracks for games such as The Mark of Kri and Unreal II: The Awakening. His work on Myst IV: Revelation in 2004 earned him his first three awards, those of "Best Live Performance Recording", "Best Original Vocal Song: Choral", and "Music of the Year" from the G.A.N.G. awards.

Wall, along with Tommy Tallarico, has produced the Video Games Live concert series, which began on July 6, 2005. The two had been planning the concert series, which presents orchestrated versions of music from dozens of games, for three years. The concerts consist of segments of video game music performed by a live orchestra with video footage and synchronized lighting and effects, as well as several interactive segments with the audience, conducted by Wall. Video Games Live was intended to take the idea of a symphonic video game music concert, which was popular in Japan, and combine it with a rock concert to make it appealing to western fans. The series is international and ongoing, with more than 70 shows planned for 2009. Wall composed the soundtracks to three games released in 2005 including the award-winning score to Jade Empire, and some of his works released since then have been 2007's Mass Effect and 2010's Mass Effect 2. Mass Effects score earned Wall several awards and nominations, as did Mass Effect 2.

Musical style and influences 

Although many of his works are orchestral, Jack Wall has worked in a wide variety of styles, including "heavy metal meets orchestral" and "tribal percussion". For Jade Empire, he focused on using Chinese instruments and Taiko drums. When writing a video game score, Wall prefers a collaborative approach with the game designers to creating the music, as he feels that the "tug back and forth of ideas" makes the music stronger. He notes, however, that he has to be flexible, and willing to create his own vision for the music. As part of this, he prefers to be able to see illustrations and game design documents before beginning, as they provide insight into the feel of the game so that his music can mesh in with it. He also believes that a good video game music composer needs to have a lot of technical sound production skill to be successful. Wall has said that the Myst and Mass Effect soundtracks are his favorites that he has created. Wall stated that he was primarily interested in scoring games that are "interesting", and that his main concern was creating something original. Although he has worked with live orchestras and synthetic orchestras, Wall recommends that game developers use a live one, despite the expense, as he feels they add a much more dynamic sound to the music and allow the composer more freedom than synthesizer samples. He also wrote the book Legendary Bim Bang, the man who invented music. A picture book for ages 1 to 7

Discography

Video games

Film and television

Awards

References

External links 

 
 
 
 
 
 

1964 births
20th-century American composers
20th-century American conductors (music)
20th-century American male musicians
21st-century American composers
21st-century American conductors (music)
21st-century American male musicians
American male composers
American male conductors (music)
Drexel University alumni
Living people
Musicians from Pennsylvania
People from Phoenixville, Pennsylvania
Video game composers